Śliwniki may refer to the following places:
Śliwniki, Greater Poland Voivodeship (west-central Poland)
Śliwniki, Gmina Ozorków in Łódź Voivodeship (central Poland)
Śliwniki, Gmina Parzęczew in Łódź Voivodeship (central Poland)